Maurice Blake may refer to:
 Maurice Carey Blake (1815–1897), American politician
Maurice Blake (philatelist) (1888–1969), American philatelist